The 2008 MTV Video Music Brazil was hosted by Marcos Mion and took place at the Credicard Hall. Brazilian rock band NX Zero was the big winner of the event. One of the most notable moments was British indie rock band Bloc Party's performance, during which the audience booed the band after noticing they were lip-synching and mimicking to a pre-recorded track instead of singing and playing live. 2008 VMB also had American singer Ben Harper opening the ceremony performing alone, before being joined by Brazilian singer Vanessa da Mata for a second performance.

Nominations
winners are in bold text.

Act of the Year
 Bonde do Rolê
 Cachorro Grande
 Cansei de Ser Sexy
 Charlie Brown Jr.
 Fresno
 Mallu Magalhães
 Nando Reis
 NX Zero
 Pitty
 Vanessa da Mata

Video of the Year
 Bonde do Rolê — "Solta O Frango"
 Cachorro Grande — "Roda Gigante"
 Cansei de Ser Sexy — "Rat Is Dead"
 Charlie Brown Jr. — "Pontes Indestrutíveis"
 CPM 22 — "Escolhas, Provas e Promessas"
 Marcelo D2 — "Desabafo"
 Nação Zumbi — "Bossa Nostra"
 NX Zero — "Pela Última Vez"
 O Rappa — "Monstro Invisível"
 Pitty — "De Você"

Hit of the Year
 Charlie Brown Jr. — "Pontes Indestrutíveis"
 Fresno — "Uma Música"
 NX Zero — "Pela Última Vez"
 Strike — "Paraíso Proibido"
 Vanessa da Mata and Ben Harper — "Boa Sorte/Good Luck"

Best New Act
 Mallu Magalhães
 Ponto de Equilíbrio
 Roberta Sá
 Strike
 Vanguart

Best International Act
 Amy Winehouse
 Britney Spears
 Coldplay
 Justice
 Katy Perry
 Kanye West
 Madonna
 MGMT
 Paramore
 Radiohead

MTV Bet
 3namassa
 China
 Garotas Suecas
 Rosana Bronk's
 Turbo Trio

Best Live Act
 Cachorro Grande
 Mallu Magalhães
 Paralamas do Sucesso e Titãs
 Pitty
 Zeca Pagodinho

Web Hit of the Year
 A Drag a Gozar
 A Gaga de Ilhéus
 As Meninas de Inri Cristo
 Dança do Quadrado
 MC Créu

Video You Made
 Eduardo Henrique with a version of "Boa Sorte/Good Luck"
 Fábio Vianna with a version of "Uma Música"
 Geraldo José with a version of "Paraíso Proibido"
 Rafael Gonçalves Micheletto with a version of "Pela Última Vez"
 Vinícius Neo with a version of "Boa Sorte/Good Luck"

Dream Band
Vocals: Marcelo D2
Guitar: Chimbinha (Banda Calypso)
Bass: Bi Ribeiro (Os Paralamas do Sucesso)
Drums: João Barone (Os Paralamas do Sucesso)

Performances
 Ben Harper and the Innocent Criminals — "In The Colors"
 Vanessa da Mata and Ben Harper — "Boa Sorte/Good Luck"
 Marcelo D2 — "Desabafo"
 Nove Mil Anjos — "Chuva Agora"
 Bloc Party — "Talons"/"Banquet"
 Bonde do Rolê — "Solta O Frango"/"Office Boy"/"Mais Uma Vez"
 2008 VMB Dream Band winners — "Acelerou"
 Pitty and Cascadura (banda) — "Inside A Beer Bottle"
 Fresno and Chitãozinho & Xororó — "Evidências"

MTV Video Music Brazil